There have been a number of TOPS class numbers assigned to proposed locomotives that have not been built for one reason or another.

Diesel locomotives

Type 1 locomotives
Class 18 - A proposed new Type 1 locomotive proposed in the mid 1980s. A 1988 proposal was for a 6-wheeled 800 hp locomotive with a maximum speed of 50 mph, similar in concept to Class 14. No prototype was constructed.

Type 3 locomotives
Class 38 - Projected classification for new generation of Type 3 freight locomotives in the 1980s. The Class 38 was dropped in favour of the Class 60.

Type 4 locomotives
Class 41 - The third use of Class 41 was for a proposed class of Class 60 locomotives with 2,500 hp engines in the early 1990s.
Class 48 - The second use of Class 48 was a proposal for a new class of locomotive for the 1990s, with gearing differences for slower freight work or higher speed loco-hauled for InterCity or parcels trains. The proposal included using proven technology for engines and electrical systems to avoid lengthy introduction and development costs associated with developing new technology.

Type 5 locomotives
Class 51 - Projected classification for the proposed "Super Deltic" locomotive intended as a follow on from the Class 50 and Class 55.
Class 62 - Projected classification for proposed Type 5 coal train locomotives in the early 1990s.
Class 65 - Projected classification for proposed 4,000 hp freight working locomotive intended for liner trains.

Electro-diesel locomotives
Class 75 - Spare classification for projected "super electro-diesel" follow on from Class 73 and Class 74.

Electric locomotives
Class 88 - The first use of Class 88 was for a proposed electric version of the Class 58, powered through 25 kV AC from overhead wire.
Class 93 - Proposed electric locomotive for use on the West Coast Main Line as part of the InterCity 250 project.

References

External links

British Rail locomotives
British Rail Unbuilt Locomotive Classes